Heritage Institute of Technology, popularly known as HITK or HIT is a self-financed institute in the state of the West Bengal. Heritage Institute of Technology is ranked one of the best engineering colleges in Eastern India. The campus is situated on the southern fringes of Kolkata. It is affiliated with Maulana Abul Kalam Azad University of Technology Kolkata.

History 
Heritage Institute of Technology was set up on the eastern fringes of Kolkata in 2001 by a group of industrialists hailing from the flourishing information technology, electronics, and related industries around Kolkata, and some public figures. The foundation behind the growth of HITK is the Kalyan Bharti Trust. To meet the demand for technical manpower and in view of fiscal constraints at the governmental level, the Kalyan Bharti Trust supplemented the state government's efforts in setting up new engineering colleges by establishing the Heritage Institute of Technology in September 2000.

Departments in Faculty of Technology and Management
The institute offers one undergraduate course (B. Tech.) and three graduate courses (M. Tech., MBA , and MCA). All courses are approved by the All India Council for Technical Education AICTE, Government of India, and the Department of Higher Education, Government of West Bengal. Since its inception, it has been affiliated to the West Bengal University of Technology, Kolkata.

The institute offers undergraduate B. Tech. course in the following engineering disciplines:
 Applied Electronics and Instrumentation Engineering
 Biotechnology
 Chemical Engineering
 Civil Engineering
 Computer Science and Business Systems
 Computer Science and Engineering (Data Science)
 Computer Science and Engineering (Artificial Intelligence & Machine Learning)
 Computer Science and Engineering
 Electrical Engineering
 Electronics and Communication Engineering
 Information Technology
 Mechanical Engineering

The graduate school offers full-time two-year Master of Technology (M. Tech.) degree in the following disciplines:
 Applied Electronics and Instrumentation Engineering
 Computer Science and Engineering
 Electronics and Communication Engineering
 Biotechnology
 VLSI
 Renewable Energy
The institute also offers full-time two-year Master of Computer Application degree.

Admission to the undergraduate B.Tech. courses are done through the West Bengal Joint Entrance Examination (WBJEE) and Joint Entrance Examination – Main (JEE-MAIN).

Campus

Facilities and Infrastructure 

 Postal  Facilites
 Sports Facilities
 Banking Facilites
 Healthcare
 Fire Safety
 Transportation
 Cafeteria
 Student Accommodation

Student Life

Cultural and Non-Academic Activities

Student Exchange
The institute signed an MoU with the New Jersey Institute of Technology (NJIT) for a student exchange programme

It has signed an MoU with the College of Natural Science, Sungkyunkwan University.

Rankings 

The National Institutional Ranking Framework (NIRF) ranked it in the 201–250 band among engineering colleges in 2022.

References

External links
 

Business schools in Kolkata
Educational institutions established in 2001
Colleges affiliated to West Bengal University of Technology
Engineering colleges in Kolkata
2001 establishments in West Bengal